Pleurastrum is a genus of green algae, specifically of the Chlorophyceae. , it was the only genus in the family Pleurastraceae.

Species
, AlgaeBase accepted the following species:
Pleurastrum insigne Chodat
Pleurastrum photoheterotrophicum Metting
Pleurastrum sarcinoideum Groover & H.C.Bold
Pleurastrum terricola (Bristol) D.M.John

References

External links

Scientific references

Scientific databases

 AlgaTerra database
 Index Nominum Genericorum

Chlamydomonadales genera
Chlamydomonadales